The 2011 Miller Superbike World Championship round was the fifth round of the 2011 Superbike World Championship. It took place on the weekend of May 28–30, 2011 at Miller Motorsports Park, in Tooele, Utah, United States. The races were held on Memorial Day Monday.

Results

Superbike race 1 classification

Superbike race 2 classification

External links
 The official website of the Superbike World Championship

Miller Round
Miller